Education in Orpington, England, is managed by the London Borough of Bromley which is the Local Education Authority. Orpington is a suburban town that forms the south-eastern edge of London's urban sprawl and is one of thirty five major centres identified in the London Plan.

Nursery and primary schools
 St Mary's Pre-school Group, Green Street Green
 Robin's Den Playgroup (Hillside Primary school)
 Happy Faces Montessori
 Charterhouse
 St Mary Cray Primary School
 St Paul's Cray CE Nursery
 Bridgehouse Pre School
 Bright Sparks
 Cannock House
 Thresher's Day Nursery
 Asquith Nursery, Crofton 
 Warren Road Primary School 
 Hillside Primary School 
 The Highway Primary School 
 Blenheim Primary School
 Darrick Wood Infant School 
 Darrick Wood Junior School
 Perry Hall Primary School 
 Holy Innocents Catholic Primary School
 Crofton Infant School
 Crofton Junior School 
 Poverest Primary School
 Tubbenden Infant School, federated with 
 Tubbenden Junior School 
 Avalon pre school playgroup, Church of Unity
 Midfield Primary School
 Leesons Hill Primary School
 Grays Farm Primary School

Secondary schools
 Darrick Wood School, a comprehensive school and sports college in Lovibonds Avenue.
 Newstead Wood School, a selective girls' secondary school in Avebury Road.
 St Olave's and St Saviour's Grammar School for Boys, a selective boys' secondary school in Goddington Lane.
 Harris Academy Orpington (formerly The Priory School), a comprehensive school and sports college in Tintagel Road.

Further education
 Orpington College is a further education college. It is affiliated with the University of Greenwich and Canterbury Christ Church University. Orpington College is the tallest building in Orpington, and was built in 1972.

References

Orpington
Orpington